The 16th Prix Jutra ceremony was held on March 23, 2014 at the Monument-National theatre in Montreal, Quebec, to honour achievements in the Cinema of Quebec in 2013. Nominations were announced in January.

Winners and nominees

References

Prix Iris
2013 in Canadian cinema
2014 in Quebec
16